Aleksandr Mikhailovich Goncharenko (born 4 August 1959 in Semipalatinsk) is a Kazakhstani football official and former player.

References

1959 births
Sportspeople from Semey
Living people
Soviet footballers
FC Spartak Semey players
FC Kairat players
FC Irtysh Pavlodar players
FC Shakhter Karagandy players
Kazakhstani footballers
FC Luch Vladivostok players
Kazakhstani expatriate footballers
Expatriate footballers in Russia
Russian Premier League players
Kazakhstani football managers
Association football defenders